Lee Wai Leng (born 11 November 1969) is a former Malaysian badminton player. Lee was the bronze medalist at the Commonwealth games with Tan Lee Wai, and she won Mixed team silver medal also where she played singles and doubles in final but Malaysia lost to England. Lee also got a bronze in 1994 Asian Games, with Yap Kim Hock in mixed doubles event, becoming the first ever Malaysian pair to medal in badminton at this discipline at the Asian Games. Lee has also won a total of five medals at the Southeast Asian Games, which includes her three at 1989 edition and rest at 1993. She had also represented her country in the World Championship between 1989 and 1993.

Achievements

Commonwealth Games 
Women's doubles

Asian Games 
Mixed doubles

Southeast Asian Games 
Women's singles

Women's doubles

References

External links 

1969 births
Living people
20th-century Malaysian women
Malaysian sportspeople of Chinese descent
Malaysian female badminton players
Badminton players at the 1990 Commonwealth Games
Badminton players at the 1994 Commonwealth Games
Commonwealth Games silver medallists for Malaysia
Commonwealth Games bronze medallists for Malaysia
Commonwealth Games medallists in badminton
Badminton players at the 1994 Asian Games
Asian Games bronze medalists for Malaysia
Asian Games medalists in badminton
Medalists at the 1994 Asian Games
Competitors at the 1989 Southeast Asian Games
Competitors at the 1993 Southeast Asian Games
Southeast Asian Games bronze medalists for Malaysia
Southeast Asian Games medalists in badminton
Medallists at the 1994 Commonwealth Games